Bid Kheyri (also Romanized as Bīd Kheyrī; also known as Bīd Kheri and Bīd Kheyr) is a village in Dowlatabad Rural District, in the Central District of Jiroft County, Kerman Province, Iran. At the 2006 census, its population was 201, in 45 families.

References 

Populated places in Jiroft County